Čedo Maras (born January 21, 1959) is a retired football goalkeeper who played in Yugoslavia and Croatia. The most notable feat in his career was winning the 1988–89 Yugoslav First League as a member of FK Vojvodina.

Club career
Born in Sinj (SR Croatia, SFR Yugoslavia), Maras made his debut in the Yugoslav First League with NK Osijek in the 1978–79 season.  In 1985, he joined Second League side RFK Novi Sad but soon after he moved to FK Vojvodina where he will play until 1990 and be part of the championship winning squad in 1989.  He later played with FK Bečej. During 1990s he played with NK Croatia Đakovo. Now he lives in Đakovo, Croatia.

References

Sources

External links
 Stats from Yugoslav Leagues at B92

1959 births
Living people
People from Sinj
Association football goalkeepers
Yugoslav footballers
Croatian footballers
NK Osijek players
RFK Novi Sad 1921 players
FK Vojvodina players
OFK Bečej 1918 players
Yugoslav First League players
Yugoslav Second League players